Travelling Heart is the second studio album by Australian singer-songwriter TC Cassidy. It was released on 16 September 2022 both digitally and on CD. It reached number two on the ARIA Australian Country Albums Chart and number 28 on the ARIA Top 50 Albums Chart.

Track listing

Personnel
TC Cassidy – vocals, background vocals
John Gardner – drums
Kevin "Swine" Grantt – upright and electric bass
Stuie French – electric guitar
Tim Crouch – fiddle, mandolin, banjo, acoustic guitar, upright bass & band leader
Jeff Taylor – piano and accordion
Bobby Terry – pedal steel guitar
Paul Hollowell – Hammond B3 organ
Angus Gill – background vocals
Susie Ahern – background vocals
Randy Kohrs – background vocals
Thomm Jutz – background vocals

Production
Angus Gill – producer, engineer
Travis Humbert – engineer
Jeff McCormack – mastering
Judy Nadin – album artwork

Charts

References

2022 albums
Country albums by Australian artists